This article refers to the architectural style. For the book by David Cannadine see Ornamentalism

Ornamentalism is a post-modern architectural style that was a reaction against Modernism.

References

Architectural styles